On January 2, 2017, at least three suicide car bombings took place in a Shia Muslim eastern district of Sadr City, as well as behind the Kindi and Imam Ali hospitals, killing 56 people and injuring more than 120 others. Haider al-Abadi, Iraq's prime minister, had informed in a news conference that the suicide bombing, in Sadr City's busy market, was operated by the suicide bomber who detonated a vehicle with explosives. The bomber had pretended to hire day labourers in the market; once labourers gathered near the vehicle, the vehicle was detonated by him. The French President François Hollande was in the city during the attacks.

Responsibility
The jihadist group Islamic State claimed the responsibility of attacks, with a targeted attack on a "gathering of Shia".

References

2017 murders in Iraq
Suicide bombings in 2017
21st-century mass murder in Iraq
2010s in Baghdad
ISIL terrorist incidents in Iraq
Islamic terrorist incidents in 2017
January 2017 crimes in Asia
January 2017 events in Iraq
Marketplace attacks in Iraq
Mass murder in 2017
Mass murder in Iraq
Suicide car and truck bombings in Iraq
Suicide bombings in Baghdad
2017-01
Terrorist incidents in Iraq in 2017
Violence against Shia Muslims in Iraq